Bernt Sjöberg (born ) is a Swedish wheelchair curler.

He participated in 2006 Winter Paralympic Games where Swedish team won bronze medals.

Teams

Private life 

References

External links 

Living people
1955 births
Swedish male curlers
Swedish wheelchair curlers
Paralympic bronze medalists for Sweden
Paralympic wheelchair curlers of Sweden
Wheelchair curlers at the 2006 Winter Paralympics
Medalists at the 2006 Winter Paralympics
Swedish wheelchair curling champions
Place of birth missing (living people)
Paralympic medalists in wheelchair curling
21st-century Swedish people